The O2 Ritz (originally known as The Ritz) is a live music venue on Whitworth Street West in Manchester, England. The venue is notable for its sprung dance floor and has a capacity of 1,500.

History
It was originally built as a dance hall in 1927, before becoming a nightclub in the 1960s.

By the 1970s and 1980s, The Ritz was popular for playing disco, soul, funk and electronic music before the opening of The Haçienda  nightclub and music venue on the same street in 1982.

It was designated a Grade II listed building in 1994.

The Ritz was taken over by HMV in 2011 and given a £2 million refurbishment, including a new sound and lighting system, as well as soundproofing while preserving its original Art Deco features.

In 2015, the venue was acquired by Live Nation Entertainment, and re-branded as O2 Ritz Manchester, as part of the O2 Academy Group.

Music at The Ritz
Most of the well-known dance bands of the 1930s and 1940s played here.

In 1961, The Ritz featured beat groups on Sunday afternoons (later replaced by bingo) such as the Fourtones (which included Allan Clarke and Graham Nash, later of the Hollies). In the 1980s, the venue hosted student/Indie discos with 'Dance your Docs off' on Monday nights
 In the late 1980s, Adrian Sherwood's On-U Sound System played a couple of seminal gigs.

Acts which have played at the venue include the Beatles, the Damned, R.E.M., the Stone Roses, Arctic Monkeys, the Smiths, Snow Patrol, Steve Harley & Cockney Rebel, Magazine, the Nosebleeds (fronted by Morrissey for the second and final time), John Cooper Clarke, Public Image Ltd, Happy Mondays, Adam Ant, New Order, Dropkick Murphys, Bad Religion, Dead Kennedys,  the Psychedelic Furs, Sublime with Rome, the Zangwills, Swans, A Certain Ratio, Liam Gallagher, Peter Hook, Dodgy and Drain Gang.

On 4 October 1982, the Smiths played their first gig consisting of four songs, supporting Blue Rondo à la Turk.

The venue also occasionally hosts events run by third-party entertainment brands such as Propaganda, GoGo, Voodoo and Erasmus Parties. It used to host nightclub event on Saturdays called Projekt.

In popular culture
The Ritz featured as a brief location in the 1961 film A Taste of Honey.

See also

Listed buildings in Manchester-M1

References

Sources

External links
Official ticket agent

1927 establishments in England
Buildings and structures completed in 1927
Music venues in Manchester
Art Deco architecture in England
Wrestling venues